Wayne Richard Grisham (January 10, 1923 – January 19, 2011) was a two-term member of the United States House of Representatives from California from 1979 to 1983.

Biography
Born in Lamar, Colorado, Grisham graduated from Jordan High School in Long Beach, California in 1940. He was a fighter pilot in the United States Army Air Forces stationed in the European theater of World War II from 1942 to 1946. During this time, his plane was shot down and he was a prisoner of war.

In 1947, he received an associate degree from Long Beach City College. In 1949, he earned a B.A. at Whittier College, in Whittier, California. He conducted graduate work at the University of Southern California in Los Angeles, California from 1950 to 1951. He was a teacher, a businessman, and he served as president of Wayne Grisham Realty from 1958 to 1978. He served as chairman of the board of directors of First Mutual Mortgage Co. from 1974 to 1978. He served as member of La Mirada City Council from 1970 to 1978. He then served as mayor of La Mirada from 1973 to 1974 and from 1977 to 1978. He served as a delegate to the California League of Cities and National League of Cities from 1970 to 1978.

Congress 
A Republican, Grisham was elected to the United States House of Representative in 1978, succeeding retiring incumbent Del Clawson.

Later career and death 
He was an unsuccessful candidate for renomination in 1982, after redistricting combined his district with that of fellow Republican David Dreier.

He served as director of the Peace Corps in Nairobi, Kenya, 1983.

He was elected to the California State Assembly in 1984 and was reelected in 1986.  In 1987, he ran for the California State Senate in a special election to succeed Democrat Paul B. Carpenter, who resigned to become a member of the California Board of Equalization, but was defeated by Democratic Norwalk City Councilman Cecil Green.  He was narrowly defeated for reelection to the state Assembly in 1988.

He was a resident of La Mirada, California.

Notes

References
 Retrieved on March 28, 2010

External links

Join California Wayne Grisham

1923 births
2011 deaths
People from Lamar, Colorado
Republican Party members of the California State Assembly
American prisoners of war in World War II
Shot-down aviators
World War II prisoners of war held by Germany
Whittier College alumni
University of Southern California alumni
California city council members
Mayors of places in California
American real estate businesspeople
United States Army Air Forces pilots of World War II
Republican Party members of the United States House of Representatives from California
20th-century American politicians
People from La Mirada, California
Military personnel from California
Military personnel from Colorado